OpenHPI is an open-source software system providing an abstracted interface to managing computer hardware, typically for chassis and rack based servers. It is production ready implementation of the Hardware Platform Interface specification from Service Availability Forum, complimenting existing hardware management standards. Founded in 2003, OpenHPI is maintained by the OpenHPI Project.

OpenHPI provides resource modeling, sensor management, control, watchdog, inventory data associated with resources, abstracted system event log, hardware events/alarms, and a managed hot-swap interface. It aims for Service Availability beyond High Availability (HA) expectations.

History 
The OpenHPI project was conceived by Carrier Grade Linux hardware experts, and announced on the Linux kernel mailing list on 19 March 2003, by Andrea Brugger. OpenHPI was described as "a universal interface for creating resource system models, such as chassis and rack-based servers, but extendable for other domains such as clustering, virtualization, and simulation". It had modular hardware support implemented using a plugin architecture, the top-level OpenHPI implementation being independent of the underlying hardware. Supporters include IBM, Intel, Samsung, HPE, and others technical equipment manufacturers.

Features 

The following features are supported by OpenHPI software:

 OpenHPI base library
 OpenHPI utility functions
 OpenHPI Daemon
 HPI Client programs and HPI shell
 Simulator Plugin
 Dynamic Simulator Plugin
 Slave Plugin
 Test Agent Plugin
 IMPI Direct Plugin
 SNMP BladeCenter/RSA Plugin
 iLO2 RIBCL Plugin
 SOAP/XML BladeSystem c-Class Plugin
 Oneview/REST Synergy Plugin
 rtas Plugin
 sysfs Plugin
 watchdog Plugin

OpenHPI also provides a set of client programs as examples for typical HPI usage, for testing, or invocation from scripts. The hpi_shell is a command shell for calling HPI functions interactively.

Releases 
The following table summarizes the main OpenHPI releases:

See also 

 SAForum
 OpenSAF
 SCOPE Alliance

References

External links 
 OpenHPI
 SA Forum

Free software
2003 software
Free software programmed in C++
Linux Foundation projects
Software using the BSD license
Application programming interfaces